The Guri reservoir is the largest reservoir in Venezuela.  The Reservoir is created by the Guri Dam.

References

Lakes of Venezuela